Franklin Park is one of two stations on Metra's Milwaukee District West Line in Franklin Park, Illinois. In Metra's zone-based fare system, Franklin Park is in zone C. As of 2018, Franklin Park is the 123rd busiest of Metra's 236 non-downtown stations, with an average of 392 weekday boardings.

As of December 12, 2022, Franklin Park is served by 48 trains (23 inbound, 25 outbound) on weekdays, by all 24 trains (12 in each direction) on Saturdays, and by all 18 trains (nine in each direction) on Sundays and holidays. On weekdays, three inbound trains originate here, and three outbound trains terminate here.

Franklin Park is a centerpiece of the Milwaukee District West Line. Located adjacent to the Canadian Pacific Railway's Bensenville Yard, the station sees a large volume of freight traffic, and many trains on the MD-W line run express to and from this station. With the two north tracks used by Metra and two south tracks used for freight (Canadian Pacific) as well as frequent Metra and freight action, Franklin Park and nearby smaller stations ( and ) are a favorite of railfans. The annual Railroad Daze festival is held at this station, and is a festival catered to railfans and celebrates the railroad's role in Franklin Park's history. The historic B-12 interlocking tower for the Milwaukee Railroad is situated one block west of the station, accompanied by a preserved Milwaukee Road caboose. This tower, constructed in the 1890s, was located at the intersection of the MD-W line and the Canadian National (ex-Soo Line/Wisconsin Central) (north) and Indiana Harbor Belt Railroad (south) tracks, but closed in July 1996 and was relocated a year later. Although the Milwaukee system as a whole ceased to exist in 1986, the tower still dons the Milwaukee Road logo.

Franklin Park Station is the last station outbound along the Milwaukee District West Line to use three tracks. It is also the closest full service Metra station to O'Hare International Airport.

Bus connections
Pace

References

External links 

Railroad History of Franklin Park
Station from 25th Avenue from Google Maps Street View
Station from Calwanger Street from Google Maps Street View

Metra stations in Illinois
Former Chicago, Milwaukee, St. Paul and Pacific Railroad stations
Franklin Park, Illinois
Railway stations in Lake County, Illinois
Railway stations in the United States opened in 1950